The Siberian is a centuries-old landrace (natural variety) of domestic cat in Russia and recently developed as a formal breed with standards promulgated the world over since the late 1980s.

The formal name of the breed is Siberian Forest Cat, but it is typically referred to as the Siberian or Siberian cat. Another formal breed name is the Moscow Semi-Longhair. The colorpoint variant, called the Neva Masquerade, is categorised as a different cat breed by some registries, including Fédération Internationale Féline (FIFé).

The cat is an ancient breed that is now believed to be ancestral to all modern long-haired cats. It is a medium to large sized, muscular breed with a bushy tail. The cat has similarities with the Norwegian forest cat, to which it is likely closely related. It is a natural breed from Siberia and the national cat of Russia. While it began as a landrace, it is selectively bred and pedigreed today in all major cat fancier and breeder organizations. 

The Siberian  is often called hypoallergenic because it produces less Fel d 1 than other cat breeds. A research study of Siberian cats native to the area of Russia from which the breed stock originated confirmed the subjects produced less Fel d 1 (the strongest among the eight known Fel d allergens produced in cat saliva, therefore, is deposited on their fur when they groom themselves) than non-Siberian cats.

History
Siberian cats are Russia’s native forest cats and are known to have existed for a long time in the dense forests of Siberia. The earliest known reference is from 1000 AD.

Outside of Russia, the Siberian cat was first mentioned in the 1864 edition of the German book Brehms Tierleben, where Brehm describes a long-haired cat breed as “a red Tobolsk cat from Siberia” (“eine rote Tobolsker Katze aus Sibirien”). Later in 1892 the Siberian cat was again mentioned in the book by Harrison Weir, who organized and wrote about some of the earliest cat shows in England in 1871.

In the Russian cat fancy, each cat club devises its own cat standards. This fact led to much confusion in other countries when the first Siberians were arriving and many appeared quite different from each other, depending on what area of Russia they originated from. One of the earliest written Siberian breed standards was publicized by the Kotofei Cat Club in St. Petersburg in 1987 under the name Sibirskaja Koschka (Siberian cat).

Officially registered Siberians first arrived in the United States in 1990 and in the United Kingdom in 2002. Although gaining in popularity, the expense of importing the cats from Russia keeps the breed still relatively rare outside of Europe.

Neva Masquerade 
The term Neva Masquerade is derived from Neva, for the river in St. Petersburg, where they are said to have originated, and Masquerade, for the mask-like coloration.

The pointed Neva Masquerade has blue eyes and a light overall coat color with darker seal tabby point markings on its head, legs, and tail. The point coloration includes the colors seal, blue, red, cream, tabby, and tortie.

References of the ancient Siberian cat breed date back a thousand years, but the colorpoint variety did not appear until the 1980s. It is believed that colorpoint Siamese and possibly Persian cats were crossed into the Siberian breed to achieve the colorpoint gene. During the introduction of the Siberian cat to other European countries and the USA in the late 1980s, the traditional colored and colorpointed variants were presented. The Siberian breed was generally recognized in the late 1990s by the cat fancy, however some registries chose to not accept colorpoint varieties in the Siberian breed.

Subsequently, the classification of the Neva Masquerade colorpoint variety is a highly debated topic under breeders, enthusiasts, organizations, and (inter)national cat registries of the Siberian cat. And the term Neva Masquerade does not have a generally accepted definition. Some registries such as TICA and WCF accept the Neva Masquerade point coloration as being a natural coat color within the Siberian cat breed. However, colorpoint Siberians are classified as a separate breed, the Neva Masquerade, by other registries, such as FIFé, CCA-AFC, and ACF. In these (inter)national cat registries the Siberian cat breed has the code [SIB], and [NEM] is used for the Neva Masquerade variant.

Description

Body 
Known to be an exceptionally agile jumper, the Siberian is a strong and powerfully-built cat, with strong hindquarters and large, well-rounded paws. Their bushy tail is medium in length and slightly shorter then the torso length. Their body lengths varies in size from medium to large. Siberians have firm, barrel-shaped torsos and medium or large sized ears, large eyes, broad foreheads, and stockier builds than other cats. The general impression of the body is one of circles and roundness. Their large round eyes give an overall sweet expression to their face. Siberians have a slight arch to their back, because their hind legs are slightly longer than the front legs. This shape and the power in their hind legs contribute to their incredible agility and enables them to jump exceptionally high.

Siberians develop rather slow, reaching their fully matured body at about five years of age. Female Siberians are considerably smaller than males.

Fur

Siberians express the three natural types of feline fur: guard hair, awn hair, and down hair. These three layers  form a semi-long to long, well developed, very dense triple-coat, from which the guard hairs are water-repellent. This dense triple-coat protects the cat from the Russian weather extremes. The fur is textured but glossy, which decreases the occurrence of matting and makes it easy to care for. The summer coat is distinctly shorter than the winter coat. Because the Siberians are a slow-maturing breed, it can take several years for the coat of young Siberians to fully develop.

Siberian cats moult twice a year. They will shed their heavy winter coat during spring. This winter moult is instigated not by a change in temperature but by a change in day length. Many Siberians will experience a less intense "mini-moult" at the end of the summer season to prepare for their thick winter coat, unlike other cats, which will experience a "heavy moult" more than twice a year.

Fur color 
As with most other cat breeds, color varieties of the Siberian vary and all colors, such as tabby, solid, tortoiseshell and colorpoint, are genetically possible. Even a rare golden coat color caused by the CORIN-gene, called “sunshine”, and the bimetallic variety, called “silver sunshine”, are found in Siberians. However, the most common color in the Siberian cat breed is brown mackerel tabby. Several cat registries do not permit the color varieties chocolate, lilac, cinnamon, and fawn in the Siberian breed.

Fur allergen levels 
While there is no hypoallergenic cat or dog breed, the decreased dander qualities of the Siberian coat have been noted and commented on for almost ten years. While there is no scientific evidence, breeders and pet owners claim that Siberians can be safe for many allergy sufferers. Since females of all feline breeds produce lower levels of Fel d1, breeders often suggest that allergic families adopt female cats. Allergy sufferers are advised to check their reactivity directly with the parent cats from whom they plan to adopt a kitten. Many people believe that the breed produces less Fel d1, the primary allergen present on cats.

The results showed the Siberian and Abyssinian cat fur as having lower  levels than the mixed breed cat. Indoor Biotechnologies cautions that the Siberian levels were still high, and that the mixed breed sample was "exceptionally high". Indoor Biotechnologies warns against using these results to make decisions of pet ownership.

This test of fur allergen levels is cited by many Siberian breeder websites as evidence the breed is hypoallergenic. Critiques include that the sample size (only 4 cats) is below statistical significance, was submitted by a Siberian breeder, and as mentioned, one cat was found to have  allergen levels of 62,813 micrograms (roughly 60× higher than any published professional study).

A not-for-profit association of breeders (Siberian Research Inc) was founded in 2005 to study allergen levels and genetic diseases in the Siberian breed. As of March 2010, fur and saliva samples from over 300 Siberians have been submitted for analysis, many directly from a veterinarian. Salivary  allergen levels in Siberians ranged from 0.08 to 27 µg per ml of saliva, while fur levels ranged from 5 to 1300 µg. The high end of these ranges is consistent with results from prior studies, though the low end is below expected results.

All Siberians tested were found to produce some Fel d1, with the highest levels being found in Siberians that have silver colored fur. About half of Siberians were found to have  levels lower than other breeds, while under twenty percent would be considered very low. Within the low group, males and females had comparable allergen levels.

Reproduction

Siberian cats tend to come into reproductive readiness earlier than other breeds, sometimes as young as five months. It is thought that this is related to the breed's closeness to its natural wild state; feral cats often die young due to harsher natural conditions. Achieving reproductive ability early and having large litters provides a biological balance to this. On average, a Siberian litter consists of five to six kittens, as compared to the average litter of three to four kittens in breeds who have been registered as pedigreed cats. However, Siberian litters may consist of as few as one and as many as nine kittens.

Siberian cats are excellent parents, with the fathers helping to care for kittens if they are allowed access to the nest. Parents are often strongly bonded and some mothers will only mate with one male. Atypical for cats, juvenile male Siberians have been seen cuddling and grooming their cousins and siblings. Siberians, due to their communal nature, often do better in pairs in captivity.

Females that have not been spayed have been noted to have litters as late as nine or ten years. However, kitten mortality is generally lower when a dam (breeding female) is between 18 months and six years of age. This difference is due to several factors: physical and emotional maturation of the dam, health and vitality of the dam, and a natural predisposition to healthier offspring from younger mothers.

Males can father kittens from as young as five months to over ten years. In regions where the breed is rare and expensive a longterm breeding career for a pedigreed male can create a risk of popular sire effect, in which one male has an overly large genetic influence on the breed. In Eastern Europe, where the breed is common and less expensive, this issue is less likely to arise than elsewhere.

During the early 1990s, it was expensive and difficult to locate and import Siberians from Eastern Europe. Therefore, inbreeding in registered purebred Siberians became common in certain regions after the breed’s introduction. Because the breed is relatively new to registration and breed books are open, breeders are able to add foundation stock to the breed. This reduces the level of relatedness within the breed, and increases vigor in the breed.

In popular culture
The variety can be seen in Russian paintings and writings dating back hundreds of years. This sets them apart from breeds that are the result of fairly recent selective breeding.

Vonda N. McIntyre introduces a Siberian Forest Cat as the pet of Spock's cousin Stephen in Enterprise the First Adventure (Pocket Books, 1986).

At least one traditional Russian folktale, collected by Alexander Afanasyev, features a Siberian cat called Kotofej Ivanovich. One version of this is known as "The Cat Who Became Head Forester".

A Siberian cat, Dorofei, was owned by Russian Prime Minister Dmitry Medvedev, and another by former Soviet president Mikhail Gorbachev. WBZ-AM talk radio host Steve LeVeille mentions his Siberian, Max, on his Boston-based program.

The 2016 film Nine Lives features a Siberian.

In the webcomic Hetalia: Axis Powers, the character Ivan "Russia" Braginski owns a Siberian cat, as shown in the strip titled "Cat Conference".

Gallery

References

External links

CFA Siberian Breed Profile

Siberian cat photos

Cat breeds
Cat breeds originating in Russia
Cat landraces
Natural cat breeds